Colletia is a genus of flowering plants in the family Rhamnaceae, with five species of spiny shrubs. All species of this genus are native to southern South America. They are non-legume nitrogen fixers.

Taxonomy

Species
Colletia comprises the following species:

 Colletia hystrix Clos - pink crucifixion thorn

 Colletia paradoxa (Spreng.) Escal. - crucifixion thorn, thorn of the cross, anchor plant

 Colletia spartioides Bertero ex Colla

 Colletia spinosissima J.F.Gmel.

 Colletia ulicina Gillies & Hook.

Species names with uncertain taxonomic status
The status of the following species and hybrids is unresolved:

 Colletia campanulata Phil.
 Colletia crenata Regel
 Colletia cruzerillo Bertero
 Colletia disperma Moc. & Sessé ex DC.
 Colletia horrida Brongn. ex Drap.
 Colletia iguanaea Scop.
 Colletia insidiosa Reissek
 Colletia longissima Steud.
 Colletia maytenoides Griseb.
 Colletia spartioides Bertero ex Savi
 Colletia spicata Humb. & Bonpl. ex Schult.
 Colletia tetrandra Clos
 Colletia tralhuen Bertero ex Colla
 Colletia treba Bertero ex Colla
 Colletia velutina Spreng.

References

External links

Strange Wonderful Things: Colletia paradoxa

Rhamnaceae
Rhamnaceae genera